James Flannigan is a British songwriter, record producer and multi instrumentalist.

Career
Flannigan is best known as a member of pop punk band Stiff Dylans (as featured in teen film Angus, Thongs and Perfect Snogging).  Since then Flannigan has since gone on to write and produce with artists including Kodaline, Andrew McMahon, Lena Meyer-Landrut, Lucy Spraggan, Alex Vargas and Bo Bruce.

He has also had his music feature in TV shows and film, including The Fault in Our Stars, Kick-Ass 2, Grey's Anatomy, Justin and the Knights of Valour and Red Band Society.

Songwriting and production credits

References

External links

Year of birth missing (living people)
Living people
British male singer-songwriters
British record producers
British multi-instrumentalists